Events in the year 2015 in Kazakhstan.

Incumbents
President: Nursultan Nazarbayev
Prime Minister: Karim Massimov

Events

January
 January 1 – The Eurasian Economic Union came into effect, creating a political and economic union between the country and Russia, Belarus, and Armenia.

Deaths
 January 5 – Vadim Glovatsky, Kazakhstani Olympic ice hockey player (1998), (Metallurg Magnitogorsk).
 December 21 – Andrei Troschinsky, Kazakhstani ice hockey player, Asian champion (1999) .

References

 
2010s in Kazakhstan
Years of the 21st century in Kazakhstan
Kazakhstan
Kazakhstan
Kazakhstan